Exploitica (styled as Exploitica Rides Again for series 2) was a late-night comedy show in the UK which ran on Channel 4, shown on Friday nights as part of the 4Later slot. Created by TV21, the show ran for two seasons from 1999 to 2000.

Format
Unlike normal comedy shows, each series utilized doctored clips from exploitation movies, B-movies, movie serials and American educational reels from the 1930s up until the mid 1980s, using superimposed thought-balloons, subtitles and sound effects for comedic effect. Notable films lampooned by the show included the 1935 Gene Autry serial The Phantom Empire and the 1962 Richard Kiel B-movie Eegah!.

Airing
Series 1 consisted of 12 episodes of a run time of 25 minutes each and aired in December 1998. 3 further episodes of series 1 were, Exploitica presents: Exploitease. The episodes included Alice in AcidLand, Guess What Happened To Count Dracula ? and Trailer Park. Series 2 was commissioned by Channel 4 for broadcast in 2000 and consisted of twenty 50 minute episodes, with ten episodes airing in early 2000 and the remaining episodes airing in late 2000.

The program occupied the midnight slot on the Channel 4 Friday night 4Later schedule of programming. Usually broadcast at 2.am on a Saturday night.

From Series 2 onwards, the program was billed as Exploitica Rides Again, but the on-screen title remained Exploitica.

See also
outTHERE, a show featuring clips from various non-mainstream films, videos and television programmes.

External links
 British Film Institute - Exploitica Rides Again
 The Internet Movie Database
 Episode Guide
 TV21'S Exploitica Secures Recommission from C4

Channel 4 comedy
2000s British comedy television series